

Medalists

60 metres Hurdles

High Jump

Shot Put

Long Jump

800 metres

Summary

Combined events at the World Athletics Indoor Championships
Pentathlon
2008 in women's athletics